John Tracy (fl. 1384–1394), of Bridport, was an English politician.

He was a Member (MP) of the Parliament of England for Bridport in April 1384, November 1384, 1385, 1386, February 1388, September 1388, January 1390, 1393 and 1394.

References

Year of birth missing
Year of death missing
English MPs April 1384
People from Bridport
English MPs November 1384
English MPs 1385
English MPs 1386
English MPs February 1388
English MPs September 1388
English MPs January 1390
English MPs 1393
English MPs 1394